Olympic Steel, Inc. is a metals service center based in Cleveland, Ohio. The company processes and distributes carbon, coated and stainless flat-rolled sheet, coil and plate steel, aluminium alloy, tin plate, and metal-intensive branded products primarily in the United States. Metals processing and value added services include tempering, stretch leveling, cutting-to-length, slitting, edging, shearing, blanking, burning, forming, shot blasting, laser punching, plate rolling, fabricating, machining, and welding. Its Chicago Tube & Iron subsidiary is a distributor of steel tubing, pipe, bar, valves & fittings, and fabricates pressure parts.

History
Olympic Steel was founded in 1954 by brothers Sol and Morris Siegal and Sam Sigel. Initially, it was a metals trading company and owned no facilities.

In 1956, it opened an  facility in Bedford Heights, Ohio. The company offered multiple flat-rolled steel products, including coil and plate products.

In 1975, Michael Siegal, son of Sol Siegal, joined the company. By 1985, the company had founded a Southern sales office in Georgia and another office in Pennsylvania. Michael Siegal bought out his father's share of the company in 1984 and David Wolfort joined the team as the company's first General Manager.

In 1987, Olympic Steel acquired Viking Steel Company, based in Elk Grove Village, Illinois.

In 1988, the Philadelphia Division was formed by moving the Eastern sales office to a full warehouse facility in Lester, Pennsylvania.

In 1989, the Southern Division moved to Greenville, South Carolina, consolidating several sales offices in the region and Olympic Steel Trading was formed to sell steel in Puerto Rico and Mexico.

In 1990, the company acquired Eastern Steel based in Milford, Connecticut and Juster Steel of Minneapolis, Minnesota.

In 1994, the company became a public company, selling 4,000,000 shares in an initial public offering. In 1996, it offered 2,500,000 more shares.

In 1995, the company acquired Lafayette Steel & Processing based in Detroit, Michigan.

In 1997, the company acquired Southeastern Metal Processing for $17 million. It also broke ground on its second temper mill at a facility in Bettendorf, Iowa.

In 1998, the company entered the machining business by purchasing the assets of JNT Machining for $795,000 and opening a facility in Chambersburg, Pennsylvania.

In June 2006, the company acquired the Siler City, North Carolina-based Tinsley Group for $10 million.

In 2008, the company announced fabrication facilities to be built in Dover, Ohio and Sumter, South Carolina.

In August 2010, the company acquired a 100,000 square foot facility in Mount Sterling, Kentucky for plate burning, machining, forming and shot blasting metals processing services.

In April 2011, the company acquired a 177,000 square foot facility on U.S. Steel's Gary Works site in Gary, Indiana to house its temper mill and cut-to-length line.

In May 2011, the company acquired Chicago Tube & Iron for $156 million. It also opened a 43,000-square-foot warehouse and distribution center in Kansas City.

In June 2012, the company was named 2012 Service Center of the Year by American Metal Market.

In May 2013, the founder, Sol Siegal, died.

In June 2015, the company announced the addition of a new cut-to-length stretcher leveler line at its Winder, Georgia facility.

In May 2017, the company shut its plant in Chatham County, North Carolina, resulting in 51 layoffs.

In April 2018, the company acquired the assets of Berlin Metals, one of the largest North American service centers processing and distributing prime tin mill products and stainless steel strip in slit coil form.

Effective January 1, 2019, Michael Siegal transitioned from CEO to Executive Chairman and Richard T. Marabito was elected CEO.

In January 2019, the company acquired the assets of McCullough Industries, a branded self-dumping hopper manufacturer in Kenton, Ohio.

In April 2019, the company opened a distribution facility in Hanceville, Alabama supplying steel plate and sheet product to the areas.

In August 2019, the company acquired assets related to the manufacturing of the EZ-Dumper hydraulic dump inserts. 

In December 2020, the company acquired Action Stainless & Alloys.

References

1954 establishments in Ohio
1994 initial public offerings
Companies based in Cleveland
Companies listed on the Nasdaq
Manufacturing companies based in Cleveland
Steel companies of the United States